The Bureau Central de Renseignements et d'Action (Central Bureau of Intelligence and Operations), abbreviated BCRA, was the World War II-era forerunner of the SDECE, the French intelligence service. It was created by Charles de Gaulle in 1940 as a Free French intelligence system that combined both military and political roles, including covert operations, though this policy was reversed in 1943 by Emmanuel d'Astrier (1900-69), who insisted on civilian control of political intelligence. The Bureau was first commanded by Major André Dewavrin, who had taken the nom de guerre "Colonel Passy", while journalist Pierre Brossolette (1903-44) headed the civilian-arm.

History
The organization was preceded by the Deuxième Bureau, which had been the French external military intelligence agency since 1871.

Following the defeat of France in 1940, the Vichy France regime's intelligence service was organized within the Centre d’information gouvernemental (Center for Government Information, CIG), under the direction of Admiral François Darlan.  According to Colonel Louis Rivet, head of the Deuxième Bureau since 1936, shortly following the defeat of France in June 1940, he, Captain Paul Paillole, and various members of the counter-intelligence service met at the Seminary of Bon-Encontre near Agen.  With the assistance of General Maxime Weygand, they planned to revive French counter-intelligence against German domination. Colonel Rivet's memoirs remain controversial, but according to his account the official Bureau des Menées Antinationales (Bureau of Anti-national Activities, BMA), officially an organization opposing communist activities and resistance efforts and accepted by the Germans under the terms of the armistice, was in reality a cover for the pursuit of collaborators with the Germans.  The main vehicle for such operations was "L’entreprise des Travaux Ruraux" (The Rural Work Enterprise), supposedly an agricultural engineering program, which performed clandestine counter-espionage under the command of Captain Paillole. In August 1942, the BMA was dissolved and recreated clandestinely as the Military Security Service by Pierre Laval and Admiral Darlan, who needed such an organisation to try to preserve Vichy French sovereignty. Paillole was given control of this new organization.

Meanwhile, on 1 July 1940, the Free French government-in-exile in London created its own intelligence service. General Charles de Gaulle assigned Major Dewavrin to command the organization. Initially known as the Service de Renseignements (SR), the agency would change its name to Bureau central de renseignements et d’action militaire (BCRAM) on 15 April 1941, and again change to Bureau central de renseignements et d’action (BCRA) on 17 January 1942.

Initially, it consisted of a single section:
 Renseignement (R): commanded by Captain André Manuel (aka "Pallas"), which worked closely with British intelligence agency MI6.

Subsequently, other sections were added:
 Action militaire (A/M) (Military action): created 15 April 1941, commanded by Captain Raymond Lagier (aka "Bienvenüe") and Fred Scamaroni, working with the British Special Operations Executive.
 Contre-espionnage (CE) (Counterintelligence): created 16 December 1941, commanded by Roger Warin (aka Roger Wybot) and Stanislas Mangin, working with the British MI5.
 Évasion (E) (Escape): created February 1942, commanded by Lieutenant Mitchell, working with the British MI9.
 Politique (N/M for non militaire) (Non-military operations): August 1942, commanded by Jacques Bingen, Jean Pierre-Bloch, and Louis Vallon

Louis Rivet resigned in opposition to the new organization.

In 1944 the DGSS became the Direction générale des études et recherches (DGER, General Directorate for Study and Research), which became the Service de documentation extérieure et de contre-espionnage (SDECE, Foreign Documentation and Counter-Espionage Service) in 1945.

See also
 Free France
 F. F. E. Yeo-Thomas
 Operation Jedburgh
 SDECE
 Special Operations Executive

Notes

External links
 BCRA at france-libre.net (fr)

 
Military units and formations established in 1940
1946 disestablishments in France
Defunct French intelligence agencies
Military history of France
Organizations established in 1940
Organizations disestablished in 1946